= Jinkara =

Rajput clan in Gujarat, India

The Jinkara are a Rajput clan found in the state of Gujarat in India. They are also known as Jhikara.

== Origin ==
The Jinkara or Jhikara are petty land owner Rajputs, who even work in their fields but do not allow their women-folk to work. even Jikara not allowed widow remarriage. Jinkara are said to have once served as warlords in the army of the Rajput chiefs. They acquired their name on account of the dependent status, as they used "jee" behind their name as respect. The word "jee" means "yes" in the Gujarati language.

== See also ==
- Rajputs of Gujarat
